"This Year's Girl" is the 15th episode of season 4 of the television show Buffy the Vampire Slayer. Written by Doug Petrie and directed by Michael Gershman, it originally aired on February 22, 2000 on the WB network.

In this episode, Eliza Dushku returns as Faith. While Buffy and the Scooby Gang (now with Riley on board) try to find Adam, Faith wakes up from a coma and finds the Mayor has left her a device which she uses to switch bodies with Buffy. Members of the Watchers' Council arrive in Sunnydale, alerted to Faith's waking.

Plot
In a dream, Buffy and Faith make a bed until Faith's blood begins to drip onto the clean, white sheets. Buffy twists the knife in Faith's stomach. Xander is investigating the Blaster gun from the Initiative, but lacks the knowledge to fix it. Giles is concerned about Buffy, who has been patrolling non-stop for days without finding Adam. On patrol, she finds Adam has strung up a demon on a tree and opened it up like a dissection experiment. When Riley wakes up in the military hospital, he attempts to leave, but Forrest and Graham try to talk him out of it. Buffy explains her plans for breaking Riley out, but it proves unnecessary as he has escaped and is waiting in Xander's basement.

At the hospital, Faith, still in a coma, is dreaming she is having a picnic with the Mayor. The dream becomes a nightmare when Buffy arrives, slits the Mayor's throat, then chases Faith into an open grave. As Faith climbs out of the grave in her dream, she awakens from her coma. Pulling free of the tubes in her body, Faith walks out into the hospital halls and encounters a girl, who tells her that months have passed since the Mayor died at Graduation Day.

Angered, Faith leaves the hospital in the girl's clothes and walks around Sunnydale looking at all the things that have changed, ending up outside Giles' house eavesdropping on the Scooby Gang's plans to attack Adam. A phone call informs Buffy that Faith is awake and on the loose. On campus the next day, Buffy and Willow run into Faith. The two Slayers talk about what happened – Faith taunting Buffy about having broken up with Angel, for whom she almost killed Faith – and fight briefly before the cops arrive and Faith flees. At the hospital, a helicopter lands, and three men carrying briefcases exit.

Xander and Giles search the streets for Faith and Adam but instead encounter Spike, who claims he intends to help Faith kill them all. Buffy and Riley discuss their jobs working to fight the forces of evil. Buffy tells him he has a choice in what he does with his life. When the conversation turns to Faith, Buffy does not mention she stabbed her to save Angel. Faith is approached by a demon who tries to give her a gift, but she kills him and runs off with the box. She breaks into a multimedia store to watch a video tape of the Mayor on a VCR and then opens a box from him that contains a special gift, which is later revealed to be called the Draconian Katra.

Giles finds the three men with briefcases are at his apartment. One of them says "Hello, Rupert", alerting Giles and the audience that the men are from the Watcher's Council.

Faith arrives at Buffy's house and takes Joyce captive; knowing Buffy will come to her mother's rescue. The Slayers have a fight that travels through almost every room of the house while Joyce calls the police. Faith, holding the gift from the Mayor, grabs Buffy's hand. A light flows through them and Buffy punches Faith, knocking her unconscious. Buffy smashes the metal contraption from the Mayor and when Joyce asks if she is okay, Buffy responds with Faith's characteristic answer: "Five by five."

Themes

In their book discussing existentialism in Buffy, Richardson and Rabb argue that this episode and the next (intended or not) explore the impact of Sartre's Look - the outside view that causes a person to redefine themselves from the perspective of the Other. They interpret Faith's defection to the Mayor and relentless dreams of Buffy stalking her as Faith's attempt to escape Buffy’s judgmental Look and the accompanying guilt it brings. When the two Slayers meet again, Faith immediately denies her possession by Buffy, saying, "You’re not me." However, she is beginning to acknowledge the guilt brought on by Buffy's Look; when Buffy expresses concern for the innocent people surrounding them, Faith claims there is no such thing as an innocent person. Richardson and Rabb point out that, therefore, Faith herself "must realize at some level she is not innocent, but is in fact guilty of horrendous crimes."

References

External links

 

Buffy the Vampire Slayer (season 4) episodes
2000 American television episodes
Buffyverse crossover episodes
Fiction about body swapping